The Rotunda is the name given to a building on the campus of Longwood University in Farmville, Virginia. It was formerly known as Ruffner Hall, but the name was changed in 2019. The original Rotunda was built in 1839 and gradually expanded along with the school over several decades, to eventually include its iconic rotunda dome, until its completion in 1907. The building was eventually destroyed in a fire on April 24, 2001. The then-Longwood College began to rebuild the structure, and it was reopened just before the fourth anniversary of the fire, on April 23, 2005. The new Rotunda, in contrast to the old, has a basement to increase instructional space.

History
Historically, The Rotunda was the college campus, prior to the school expanding west and south in the mid-twentieth century, including serving as both residence hall and classrooms. In the closing days of the American Civil War, High Street and the then-Farmville Female College saw both Confederate forces escaping the Battle of Sailor's Creek towards Appomattox Court House, and the Union Army following them.

At the time of what became known as the "Great Fire of 2001," Ruffner Hall was undergoing an extensive renovation, and there were no people or historically significant artifacts in the building. The fire also severely damaged surrounding buildings, leading to the demolition and reconstruction of next-door Grainger Hall, and renovations of four dormitories.

One noted architectural feature is a slate front step at the front door of the building, which had an indentation worn into it from thousands of students walking across it over decades. Following the fire, the damaged step was located, and a replica was installed in the reconstructed Rotunda.

Art
The centerpiece of the Rotunda is a reproduction of a sculpture of Joan of Arc by Henri Chapu, titled Joan of Arc Listening to the Voices, but popularly known as "Joanie on the Stony." The Rotunda dome itself contains four lunettes as well as paintings of Thomas Jefferson, Horace Mann, William Henry Ruffner, and Jabez Lamar Monroe Curry.

References

Longwood University
Rotundas (architecture)
Rebuilt buildings and structures in Virginia
2005 establishments in Virginia
Palladian Revival architecture in Virginia
Buildings and structures in Prince Edward County, Virginia
School buildings completed in 2005
Jeffersonian Revival architecture